The 1964–65 FIBA European Champions Cup was the eighth season of the European top-tier level professional basketball club competition FIBA European Champions Cup (now called EuroLeague). It was won by Real Madrid, for the second straight time. Real defeated CSKA Moscow in the two-legged EuroLeague Finals, after losing the first game in Moscow, 88–81, and winning the second game at Madrid, 62–76.

During the season, Radivoj Korać, a member of the Yugoslav League club OKK Beograd, set the EuroLeague's all-time single-game scoring record, including all games played since 1958, when he scored 99 points in a game versus the Swedish League club Alviks.

Competition system
25 teams. European national domestic league champions, plus the then current FIBA European Champions Cup title holders only, playing in a tournament system. The Finals were a two game home and away aggregate.

First round

|}

*After a 135 aggregate drew, a third decisive game was held in which Chemie Halle won 59–63.

Second round

|}

Automatically qualified to the quarter finals
 CSKA Moscow

Quarterfinals

|}

Semifinals

|}

Finals

|}

First leg Palace of Sports, Moscow;Attendance 15,000 (8 April 1965)

Second leg Frontón Vista Alegre, Madrid;Attendance 3,000 (13 April 1965)

Awards

FIBA European Champions Cup Finals Top Scorer
 Clifford Luyk ( Real Madrid)

References

External links
 1964–65 FIBA European Champions Cup
1964–65 FIBA European Champions Cup 
1964–65 FIBA European Champions Cup
Champions Cup 1964–65 Line-ups and Stats
Radivoj Korac's 99 points
101 Greats: Radivoj Korac

1964-65
FIBA